Lloyd Cushenberry III (born November 22, 1997) is an American football center for the Denver Broncos of the National Football League (NFL). He played college football at LSU.

Early life and high school
Cushenberry grew up in Carville, Louisiana and attended Dutchtown High School. Cushenberry initially committed to play college football at South Carolina, but de-committed before choosing LSU.

College career
Cushenberry redshirted his true freshman season. As a redshirt freshman, Cushenberry played in 11 total games with six games played on offense. Cushenberry entered his redshirt sophomore year as the Tigers' starting center. Cushenberry was named first-team All-SEC as a redshirt junior. Following the end of the season, Cushenberry announced that he would forgo his final season to enter the 2020 NFL Draft.

Professional career

Cushenberry was selected by the Denver Broncos with the 83rd overall pick in the third round of the 2020 NFL Draft. Cushenberry was named the Broncos starting center going into his rookie season. He made his NFL debut on September 14, 2020 when he started in the season opener against the Tennessee Titans.  Cushenberry finished his rookie season starting all 16 games and playing in every single offensive snap.

On November 8, 2022, Cushenberry was placed on injured reserve after suffering a groin strain. According to Cushenberry, Denver “kept him on IR after he had recovered from his groin injury," and the Broncos did not reactivate him because he was third string.

References

External links
LSU bio

1997 births
Living people
People from Ascension Parish, Louisiana
Players of American football from Louisiana
American football offensive guards
LSU Tigers football players
Denver Broncos players